Šulcava (Šolcava, formerly) is a village in Kėdainiai district municipality, in Kaunas County, in central Lithuania. According to the 2011 census, the village was uninhabited. The Gynėvė river source in nearby Šulcava.

History
At the end of the 19th century there was a folwark.

Demography

References

Villages in Kaunas County
Kėdainiai District Municipality